The Valley Line is a future , low-floor urban light rail line in Edmonton, Alberta, under construction since 2016. It will be part of the Edmonton Light Rail Transit. It will run southeast to west from Mill Woods to Lewis Farms, crossing through downtown. Originally projected for a phase 1 opening in 2018, construction began on April 22, 2016, with completion of phase 1 tentatively set for 2020, revised to 2021, revised again to 2022, and started test runs (no passengers) in the first quarter of 2023. Upon completion of the entire line, the Valley Line is expected to serve more than 100,000 commuters daily, nearly matching the current Capital Line and Metro Line in terms of capacity and ridership.

Unlike the other trains in the system, the Valley Line will initially operate low-floor Bombardier Flexity Freedom trains, which were first designed for Line 5 Eglinton in Toronto. Forty other new low-floor light rail vehicles were ordered in 2021 from Hyundai Rotem for the Valley Line, to be put in service when phase 2 to Lewis Farms opens.

Valley Line Southeast (Downtown to Mill Woods)
Planning studies for an LRT route from downtown to Mill Woods began in early 2009. In December 2009, Edmonton City Council approved a new low-floor train route that would leave a new ground-level station at Churchill Square on 102 Avenue between 100 and 99 Streets before stopping in The Quarters redevelopment on 102 Avenue between 97 Street and 96 Street. From here the route enters a tunnel and travels beneath 95 Street descending into the river valley to cross the North Saskatchewan River on the new Tawatinâ Bridge, east of Louise McKinney Park. The route then climbs the hill adjacent to Connors Road then proceeds east along 95 Avenue and southbound at 85 Street. The route travels southbound along 85 Street, crossing the intersection north of Bonnie Doon Mall and shifting to 83 Street, continuing south and east. Just north of Argyll Road, the line is lifted onto an elevated guideway over Davies Industrial. Finally, the line proceeds south along 75/66 Street until it reaches Mill Woods Town Centre. Within this line the proposed stops are: Quarters, Muttart, Strathearn, Holyrood, Bonnie Doon, Avonmore, Davies (to include a bus terminal and park & ride), Millbourne/Woodvale, Grey Nuns, and Mill Woods Town Centre. The maintenance and storage of vehicles for the line will be at the new Gerry Wright Operations and Maintenance Facility, at Whitemud Drive and 75 Street.

On June 1, 2011, City Council approved $39 million in funding to proceed with preliminary engineering for the Valley Line. In November 2011 City Council voted to allocate $800 million to the project, with the hopes of starting construction by 2014 and an expected completion date of 2018. A funding plan was approved in October 2012 in which the city would contribute $800 million into the project with the remaining $1 billion coming from the provincial and federal governments.

On February 15, 2012, city council approved the Downtown LRT concept plan. The Downtown LRT Project became part of the Southeast to West LRT project. The city hoped to have money in place by the end of 2013 for the $1.8-billion LRT line from downtown to Mill Woods to start construction in 2016. City council committed $800 million, the federal government invested $250 million, and $235 million would come from the provincial government, leaving a $515 million funding gap delaying the project. On March 11, 2014, it was announced that the project would be completely funded with an additional $150 million from the federal government and $365 million from the provincial government.

Land procurement began in 2011 and utility relocation began in 2013, completion of the first stage was expected in 2020. The official groundbreaking of the new LRT Valley Line was on April 22, 2016.
  
As of September 2019, this segment of the line was a year behind schedule of its projected December 2020 opening date. The 2019 construction season posed a challenge to crews due to frequent rain.

In December 2019, completion of the line was pushed back until 2021 after TransEd found a car-sized piece of concrete underneath the north berm of the Tawatinâ Bridge.

On August 10, 2022, the City of Edmonton and TransEd announced another delay, as inspections in mid-July found cracks in three supporting piers on elevated portions of the line. Further inspections revealed that thirty of the forty-five piers were cracked. An initial assessment named lateral thermal expansion as a potential factor in creating the cracks. Later analysis determined that the rebar was inadequate, and ideas were being tested as to how to best repair the piers. As of December 2022 the Valley Line had not opened and no definite opening date had been announced. Before the damaged piers were discovered, trains were being tested on tracks between the Gerry Wright OMF and the Mill Woods stop. During pier remediation, testing took place only on portions of the line that were not elevated.

On January 3, 2023, the project managers announced that the structural repairs of the cracked pillars were complete, and that testing was being done on all sections of the line including the elevated portions. An opening date was not announced.

Valley Line West (Downtown to Lewis Farms)
An expansion to Lewis Farms, with the West Edmonton Mall en route, is in the early stages of construction as part of the  Valley Line.

The option approved by Council in 2010 has the west LRT extension run from downtown along 104 Avenue and Stony Plain Road to 156 Street, then south on 156 Street to Meadowlark Health And Shopping Centre, and then west along 87 Avenue to West Edmonton Mall and beyond. Proponents of this route cited opportunities for transit-oriented development.

In 2016, the Valley Line West received funding through the Government of Canada’s Public Transit Infrastructure Fund (PTIF) to review the preliminary design that was completed in 2013. The funding covers work to determine the most appropriate project delivery method (P3, for example) and to develop a business case for construction funding.

The Government of Canada is providing approximately $948 million for the Valley Line West expansion, and the Government of Alberta has committed approximately $1.04 billion for the project. The expansion is projected to cost approximately $2.67 billion in total. Edmonton has selected Marigold Infrastructure Partners to build the western section of the Valley Line. Preparation work, such as the relocation of underground utilities and clearing of land along the route, has already begun. Construction of the expansion is scheduled to commence in 2021, and it is expected to open in 2026 or 2027.

Stations

Valley Line Southeast (under construction)

Valley Line West (under construction)

References

External links
 Valley Line City of Edmonton
  published by the City of Edmonton. An animated tour of the proposed Valley Line
  published by the City of Edmonton. An animated tour of the proposed Valley Line West LRT extension

Edmonton Light Rail Transit
Buildings and structures under construction in Canada
Tram and light rail transit systems under construction
Rapid transit lines in Canada